The 1923 Southern Illinois Maroons football team was an American football team that represented Southern Illinois Normal University—now known as Southern Illinois University Carbondale— as a member of the Illinois Intercollegiate Athletic Conference (IIAC) during the 1923 college football season. Led by seventh-year head coach William McAndrew, the Maroons compiled an overall record of 3–2–2 with a mark of 2–1 in conference play, tying for sixth place in the IIAC. Southern Illinois played home games at Normal Field in Carbondale, Illinois.

Schedule

References

Southern Illinois
Southern Illinois Salukis football seasons
Southern Illinois Maroons football